Amycini is a tribe of jumping spiders. It has been treated as the subfamily Amycinae.

Genera
Wayne Maddison in 2015 placed the following genera in the tribe:

Acragas Simon, 1900
Amycus C. L. Koch, 1846
Anaurus Simon, 1900
Arnoliseus Braul, 2002
Encolpius Simon, 1900
Frespera Braul & Lise, 2002
Hypaeus Simon, 1900
Letoia Simon, 1900
Macutula Ruiz, 2011
Maenola Simon, 1900
Mago O. P.-Cambridge, 1882
Noegus Simon, 1900
Vinnius Simon, 1902

References

Salticidae